The Taipei Metro Fu Jen University station is a station on the Xinzhuang Line located in Xinzhuang District, New Taipei, Taiwan. The station opened on 5 January 2012, and is named after the adjoining Fu Jen Catholic University.

Station overview

This two-level, underground station has an island platform. It is located beneath the intersection of Zhongzheng Rd. and Lane 508, Zhongzheng Rd. It was originally scheduled to open in 2013, but it began service earlier 5 January 2012. It was originally planned as the western terminus of the Xinzhuang Line, hence the station number (O1); the new terminus will instead be Huilong. It served as the western terminus of the Xinzhuang Line when the New Taipei City portion of the Xinzhuang Line opened on January 5, 2012 until Danfeng and Huilong stations opened on June 29, 2013.

Construction
It has four entrances, one accessibility elevator, and two vent shafts.

Station layout

Exits
Exit 1: Zhongzheng Rd., near the main gate of Fu Jen University 	
Exit 2: Fuyin Rd, near Jianguo 1st Rd. 	
Exit 3: Zhongzheng Rd., opposite gas station	
Exit 4: Zhongzheng Rd., beside gas station

Around the station
Fu Jen Catholic University	
San-Chung Bus Company, Sanchong station	
Xinzhuang Branch, Fuying Police Station

References

Zhonghe–Xinlu line stations
Railway stations opened in 2012
Railway stations at university and college campuses